Tall Timbers may refer to:
 Tall Timbers, Anne Arundel County, Maryland, United States
 Tall Timbers, St. Mary's County, Maryland, United States
 Tall Timbers (film), a 1937 film directed by Ken G. Hall
 Tall Timbers Plantation, a former quail hunting plantation in Leon County, Florida, United States
 Tall Timbers Research Station and Land Conservancy, a research and learning facility on the former plantation

See also
 Tall Timber (disambiguation)